Tilburg railway station is a railway station located in Tilburg in the province of North Brabant, Netherlands. The station was opened on 5 October 1863 and is located on the Breda–Eindhoven railway and Tilburg–Nijmegen railway. The train services are operated by Nederlandse Spoorwegen (NS).

North of this train station used to be the large Tilburg Works, where large scale work were carried out on locomotives. Since 2013 these works are carried out northeast of the city in a new industrial area, called Loven-Noord, along the Tilburg–Nijmegen railway.

Gallery

Train services
The following services currently call at Tilburg:
2x per hour intercity services The Hague - Rotterdam - Dordrecht - Breda - Tilburg - Eindhoven
2x per hour intercity services Zwolle - Deventer - Arnhem - Nijmegen - 's-Hertogenbosch - Tilburg - Breda - Roosendaal
1x per hour night train (nachtnet) service Rotterdam - Breda - Tilburg - Eindhoven (weekends only)
2x per hour local services (sprinter) Tilburg Universiteit - Tilburg - Best - Eindhoven
2x per hour local services (sprinter) Arnhem - Nijmegen - Oss - 's-Hertogenbosch - Tilburg - Gilze-Rijen - Breda - Dordrecht

Bus services
The station is served by city bus services (stadsbussen) as well as several regional bus services (streekbussen)

City services

There are 9 city bus lines. All lines are operated by Arriva under the Bravo brand. The routes of the city buses are as follows:

 1: Quirijnstok - Heikant - Kraaiven - Het Zand - Centraal Station - City Centre - Oud Zuid - Stappegoor - ETZ Elisabeth
 2: Reeshof - Wandelbos - Het Zand - De Reit - Centraal Station - City Centre - Broekhoven - ETZ Elisabeth - Stappegoor - Goirle
 3: Centraal Station - Wandelbos - Reeshof - Koolhoven
 4: Centraal Station - University - Witbrant - Reeshof
 5: Centraal Station - Goirke - Heikant - Stokhasselt
 6: Centraal Station - Loven - Goirke - Quirijnstok - Heikant
 7: Wandelbos - Goirke - Centraal Station - City Centre - De Reit - Zorgvlied - Blaak
 8: Centraal Station - City Centre - Korvel - Het Laar
 9: Centraal Station - Oost - Berkel-Enschot Dorp - Udenhout Dorp

Regional services
All lines are operated by Arriva under the Bravo brand, with the exception of line 450, operated by Belgian De Lijn.

 131: Rijen - Hulten - Gilze -  Tilburg
 132: Breda - Ulvenhout - Chaam (- Ulicoten) - Baarle Nassau - Alphen - Riel - Goirle - Tilburg
 136: 's-Hertogenbosch - Vlijmen - Nieuwkuijk - Drunen - Waalwijk - Sprang-Capelle - Kaatsheuvel - Loon op Zand - Tilburg
 140: 's-Hertogenbosch - Vught - Helvoirt - Haaren - Oisterwijk - Berkel-Enschot - Tilburg
 141: Tilburg - Moergestel - Spoordonk - Oirschot - Best
 142: Tilburg - Hilvarenbeek - Diessen - Middelbeers - Oostelbeers - Oirschot - Best
 143: Tilburg - Hilvarenbeek - Esbeek - Lage Mierde - Hooge Mierde - Reusel
 300: (Bravo direct) 's-Hertogenbosch - Waalwijk - Sprang-Capelle - Kaatsheuvel - Efteling - Loon op Zand - Tilburg
 301: (Bravo direct) 's-Hertogenbosch - Vlijmen - Drunen - Waalwijk - Sprang-Capelle - Kaatsheuvel - Efteling - Loon op Zand - Tilburg
 327: (Bravo direct) Breda - Teteringen - Oosterhout - Oosteind - Dongen - Tilburg
 328: (Bravo direct) Oosterhout - Oosteind - Dongen - Tilburg
 450: Tilburg - Goirle - Poppel - Weelde - Ravels - Oud-Turnhout - Turnhout
 601: (school line) Centraal Station - Stappegoor
 630: (school line) Gilze → Tilburg
 632: (school line) Baarle-Nassau → Alphen → Rechte Heide → Riel → Goirle → Tilburg
 801: Tilburg - Efteling

External links
NS website 
Dutch Public Transport journey planner 

Railway stations in Tilburg
Railway stations opened in 1863
Railway stations on the Staatslijn E